Connacht Senior Cup may refer to:
 Connacht Senior Cup (rugby union)
 Connacht Schools Rugby Senior Cup, a rugby union competition.
 Connacht Senior Cup (association football)
 Connacht Senior League Challenge Cup, an association football competition.

See also
 Connacht Cup (disambiguation)
 Connaught Cup (disambiguation)

Sports competitions in Connacht